Fritz Lange (born 17 April 1940 in Weißenfels) is a former East German slalom canoeist who competed in the 1960s. He won two medals in the K-1 team event at the ICF Canoe Slalom World Championships with a gold in 1963 and a silver in 1965.

References

1940 births
German male canoeists
Medalists at the ICF Canoe Slalom World Championships
People from Weißenfels
Living people
Sportspeople from Saxony-Anhalt